The Romford Puppy Cup is a greyhound racing competition held annually at Romford Greyhound Stadium. 

It was inaugurated in 1975. The competition is one of the leading races for greyhounds under the age of two and offers £10,000 to the winner which is the equal second highest prize money purse for puppies behind the Ladbrokes Puppy Derby and equal with The Puppy Derby.

Past winners

Venues & Distances
1975-present (Romford 400 metres)

Sponsors
2006-2007 Stadium Bokmakers
2008-present Corals

References

Greyhound racing competitions in the United Kingdom
Sport in the London Borough of Havering
Recurring sporting events established in 1975
1975 establishments in England